Every sultan of the Ottoman Empire had his own monogram, called the tughra, which served as a royal symbol. A coat of arms in the European heraldic sense was created in the late 19th century. Hampton Court requested from the Ottoman Empire a coat of arms to be included in their collection. As the coat of arms had not been previously used in the Ottoman Empire, it was designed following this request, and the final design was adopted by Sultan Abdul Hamid II on 17 April 1882.

Design
The emblem features an ornate cartouche ensigned by a tughra. The cartouche is surrounded by various elements of the state, including two flags: the red star and crescent flag of the Anatolian and Asian eyalets, and the green flag of the Rumelia Eyalet, largely obscured by a cornucopia. The North African provinces are not represented. Behind the flags are a number of spears and other weapons. 

At the top, golden light rays radiate from the sun with the tughra seal of the sultan inscribed in golden letters on a green disk background. The tughra reads in Arabic, "Mahmud Khan son of Abdulhamid, forever victorious", written out as: محمود خان بن عبد الحميد مظفر دائماً (Mahmūd Ḫān bin Abdulhamīd muẓaffar dāʾimā). The inscription in the large green crescent reads in Arabic: "Relying on Divine success, the king of the Sublime Ottoman State", written out as: المستند بالتوفيقات الربانية ملك الدولة العلية العثمانية (al-Mustanidu bi't-Tawfiqāti'r-Rabbānīyah Malik ad-Dawlatu'l-Alīyati'l-Uthmāniyah).

Hanging beneath the lower flourish are the medals of five Ottoman military decorations. In keeping with the Islamic proscription against depicting animate beings, no animals such as supporters are included in the design.

Symbols
The symbols in the coat of arms represent the following:

Green flag of either Rumelia Eyalet or Ottoman Caliphate on the left,
Red flag of Anatolia Eyalet and Asian eyalets on the right,
Elaborate turban above the central shield represents the founder of the Ottomans, Osman Gazi, and it symbolizes the Ottoman dynasty’s throne as the leader or caliph of all Muslims in the world,
 Elliptical shield with a stylized Sun motif in the middle surrounded by a number of stars. The number can vary either 12 or 16, the latter case representing the 16 Great Turkic Empires,
Flowers on the left symbolize the tolerance of the Ottomans,
Weight balance on the left symbolizes the justice of the Ottomans,
Books on the left under the balance are the Quran and the body of law (kanunname), symbolizing the Islamic state,
Weapons on the left and right symbolize the Ottoman military, with the anchor on the left representing the Ottoman Navy and the Ottoman Cannon on the right,
The Sun symbolizes the greatness of the Ottoman state,
Green medallion on the Sun with the sultan's seal (tughra) within symbolizes the great Ottoman dynasty,
Green hilal (crescent) below the tughra symbolizes the Ottoman state as the guardian of all Muslims in the world,
Below the central shield are torches and a bow and arrows, 
The flourish board with hanging medallions symbolizes the roots of the Ottoman state and Turkish culture,
Medallions hanging in the bottom symbolize various ethnic nations within the Ottoman Empire.

Different designs
There are several different versions of the 1882 coat of arms:

Pre-1882 coats of arms

See also
Flags of the Ottoman Empire
National emblem of Turkey
Islamic flags

References

Ottoman Empire
Government of the Ottoman Empire
Ottoman culture
National symbols of Turkey
Turkish coats of arms
1882 introductions
1882 in the Ottoman Empire
Ottoman Empire
Ottoman Empire
Ottoman Empire
Ottoman Empire
Ottoman Empire
Ottoman Empire
Ottoman Empire
Ottoman Empire